Maypacius is a genus of African nursery web spiders that was first described by Eugène Louis Simon in 1898.

Species
 it contains nine species, found only in Africa:
Maypacius bilineatus (Pavesi, 1895) (type) – Central, East Africa, Madagascar
Maypacius christophei Blandin, 1975 – Congo
Maypacius curiosus Blandin, 1975 – Congo
Maypacius gilloni Blandin, 1978 – Senegal
Maypacius kaestneri Roewer, 1955 – West, Central Africa
Maypacius petrunkevitchi Lessert, 1933 – Angola, Rwanda
Maypacius roeweri Blandin, 1975 – Congo
Maypacius stuhlmanni (Bösenberg & Lenz, 1895) – Tanzania (mainland, Zanzibar)
Maypacius vittiger Simon, 1898 – Madagascar

See also
 List of Pisauridae species

References

Araneomorphae genera
Pisauridae
Spiders of Africa